Bayt Yaram is a village and historical fortress southwest of Sanaa in Bani Matar District of Sanaa Governorate, Yemen.

History 
The early 13th-century writer Yaqut al-Hamawi mentions Bayt Yaram (which he vocalizes as Bayt Yurām) as one of the fortresses of Yemen. It is also mentioned in the Kitab al-Simt of Muhammad ibn Hatim al-Yami al-Hamdani in connection with the events of the year 1264 (662 AH), as "Hisn Yaram". It also appears several times in the Ghayat al-amani of Yahya ibn al-Husayn'', misspelled as "Bayt B-rām".

References 

Villages in Sanaa Governorate